The IWI X95 (formerly known as the Micro-Tavor, MTAR or MTAR-21) is an Israeli bullpup assault rifle designed and produced by Israel Weapon Industries (IWI) as part of the Tavor rifle family, along with the TAR-21 and the Tavor 7. IWI US offers the rifle in semi-automatic only configuration as the 'Tavor X95'.

In November 2009, the X95 was selected as the future standard issue weapon of the Israeli infantry.

Design

The X95 can be easily distinguished from the TAR-21 (as well as from the CTAR-21, STAR-21, and GTAR-21) by the location of its charging handle. The X95's charging handle is closer to the pistol grip, whilst the TAR-21's charging handle is closer to its muzzle. The X95 also features a redesigned buttstock and a magazine release near the pistol grip.
With the use of a relatively simple conversion kit, the X95 can be converted from a 5.56mm assault rifle to a 9mm submachine gun. A suppressor can also be attached, as part of the 9mm conversion kit, or as part of a replacement handguard which integrates the muzzle brake, suppressor, and handguard. The X95 also has its own underslung grenade launcher, the X95 GL 40. A discontinued production model of the X95, the X95-GL had the capability to mount an M203 grenade launcher on an extended notched barrel.

When configured in 9mm, the X95 uses a blowback system to cycle through the ammunition, whilst using the same body as the gas-operated rifle system. It uses Colt 9mm SMG magazines. A suppressor can be mounted that allows for the use of both supersonic and subsonic loads. The barrel is of the same length as of the rifle configuration, but has a 1:10 in rifling twist to stabilise the heavy 9mm round.

As of Spring 2020, all new 5.56×45mm NATO production X95's were upgraded with the .300 AAC Blackout recoil mechanism.

Variants

There are three different handguards currently available for the X95: the first being rounded so it can mount the suppressor inside of the handguard, and is currently only available for military issue; the second is a rectangular one with integrated rails at the 3, 6 and 9 o'clock positions, and has removable rail covers; and the third is an elongated version of the second, made for IWI US Tavor X95s. The rounded handguard originally had separate picatinny rails on the receiver and handguard, but IWI has produced a full-length flattop rail and an underside rail for it; the other two handguards have integrated flattop rails.

The X95 comes with the option of changing out the pistol grip with either the standard Tavor Talon trigger guard, a traditional trigger guard, or any compatible third-party accessory.

The X95 comes in a number of variants (including):

Military variants

X95
The X95 is chambered in either 5.56×45mm NATO or .300 AAC Blackout. The .300 BLK configuration features a gas regulator for both supersonic and subsonic loads.

X95 330: Carbine configuration with a  barrel and a  overall length
X95 380: Assault rifle configuration with a  barrel and a  overall length, out of production and replaced by the X95 419
X95 419: Assault rifle configuration with a  barrel and a  overall length
X95-L: A semi-automatic only variant of the X95 that is intended for marksman use by the IDF. It features a  barrel, an integrated bipod and is issued with a long-range sight.
X95-GL: A variant of the X95 (still currently in service in the IDF just not in production) that has the ability to mount a M203 grenade launcher on its longer notched barrel. It has since been superseded by the IWI GL 40 grenade launcher, which can be mounted on the current standard flattop X95 without the need for modifications or additional tools.

X95-R
The X95-R is chambered in 5.45×39mm and can easily be rechambered to the three other calibres that IWI offers.
X95-R 330: Carbine configuration with a  barrel and a  overall length
X95-R 419: Assault rifle configuration with a  barrel and a  overall length

X95 SMG
The X95 SMG is chambered in 9×19mm Parabellum and is also available as a conversion kit.
X95 SMG: Submachine gun variant with a  barrel and a  overall length
X95-S SMG: An integrally suppressed variant of the X95 SMG with a  barrel and a  overall length

Licensed variants
 Zittara: Indian produced version of the X95 modified to use the local 5.56×30mm MINSAS cartridge, manufactured by the Ordnance Factories Board. However, it was not adopted for service.
Fort-223: Ukrainian produced version of the X95 330, readily converted to the X95 SMG or X95-S SMG, manufactured by RPC Fort.
Fort-224: Ukrainian produced version of the X95-R 330 manufactured by RPC Fort.

Civilian variants

IWI US
All Tavor X95s sold on the U.S. civilian market are semi-automatic only and come with an elongated handguard and a thicker buttpad to comply with the firearm laws of the U.S.

 XB13SBR: A U.S. version of the X95 419, with a  overall length.
 XB16: A U.S. version of the X95 419, with a  overall length.
 XB16L: An XB16 with left-handed controls pre-installed.
 XB16-BLK: An XB16 re-barrelled in .300 AAC Blackout.
 XB17-9: 9×19mm calibre carbine with a  barrel and a  overall length.
 XB18: 5.56×45mm rifle with a  barrel and a  overall length.
 XB18RS: 5.56×45mm rifle with an  barrel and a  overall length; integrated permanent muzzle brake and a 10-round magazine to be compliant with laws of certain states. ("RS" stands for Restricted State.)

Note: IWI US retails the Tavor X95s in a variety of colours, including Black (B), Flat Dark Earth (FD), and OD Green (G); the letter "B" in the rifles designations can be switched with any of the other colour letters.

IWI Canada
All Tavor X95s sold on the Canadian civilian market are semi-automatic only and come with a  barrel to meet Canadian firearms law as non-restricted weapons. In 2021, Israeli surplus Tavor X95s began to be sold on the Canadian market.

Users

 : The Angolan Armed Forces uses the X95.
 : State Border Service (Azerbaijan) and Marine Infantry of Azerbaijan uses the X95.
 : The National Police of Colombia uses the X95.
 : The Χ95 is used by the Cypriot Special Forces.
 : Used mostly by security services and protection details.
 : The Honduran army and special forces uses the X95.
 : India's Central Reserve Police Force (CRPF) ordered 12,000 X95 rifles which entered service in early 2011. Following the use of the weapon by Indian forces fighting the insurgency in Kashmir, CRPF commanders have stated that the X95 is a more effective assault rifle than the AKM, due to its small size, power, longer range and lighter weight. In late 2002, India signed an  deal with Israel Military Industries for 3,070 manufactured TAR-21s to be issued to India's special forces personnel, where its ergonomics, reliability in heat and sand might give them an edge at close-quarters and employment from inside vehicles. The new Tavor X95s have a modified single-piece stock and new sights, as well as Turkish-made MKEK T-40 40mm under-barrel grenade launchers. 5,500 have been recently inducted and more rifles are being ordered.
 : Used by Indonesian Air Force Infantry Special Forces Kopasgat.
: In November 2009, the IDF announced that the X95 would become the standard infantry weapon of the IDF, with the addition of an integrated grenade-launcher. In 2014, the IDF announced that in the future (from as early as the end of 2014) some infantry units could start to be issued some numbers of an improved X95, which will have a longer  barrel, instead of the original  barrel of the X95, and a lighter trigger pull.
 : The Mongolian special forces uses the X95.
 : The DGSN uses the X95 since 2018.
: Used by Special Anti-terrorist Unit - Tiger.
 : The Philippine Coast Guard and the Philippine National Police uses the X95.
 
 : RPC Fort offers the X95 330 as the Fort-223, and the X95-R as the Fort-224. The Fort-224 is in service of the National Guard of Ukraine.
 : The Pennsylvania Capitol Police uses the X95.

References

External links

 Israel Weapon Industries (I.W.I.): IWI X95
 isayeret.com Tavor Guide

.300 BLK firearms
5.56 mm assault rifles
9mm Parabellum submachine guns
Rifles of Israel
Bullpup rifles
Israeli inventions
Weapons and ammunition introduced in 2009